The Copa América is the main football competition of the men's national football teams governed by CONMEBOL. Held since 1916, it is the oldest international continental football competition. It was originally called the South American Championship, changing to the current name in 1975.

Colombia have played in two Copa América finals. They lost the 1975 final play-off against Peru, but won the title at their first home tournament in 2001.

Overall record

2001 Copa América

Colombia won all six tournament matches in regular time and without conceding. This achievement is a rarity in Copa América history. The same feat was achieved by Uruguay in 1917 and 1987, and by Argentina in 1921. However, those teams only played two or three matches at those tournaments. Víctor Aristizábal, who played for Cali in the Colombian division at the time, scored in all matches except the final at least once and became the tournament's top scorer.

Record by opponent

Colombia's highest victory in tournament history is a 4–0 against Venezuela in 1979. Their biggest defeat was a 0–9 loss against Brazil in 1957.

Record players

Top goalscorers

Awards and records

Team awards
 Champions 1x (2001)
 Second place 1x (1975)
 Third place 5x (1987, 1993, 1995, 2016 and 2021)

Individual awards
 MVP 1987: Carlos Valderrama
 Top scorer 1975: Ernesto Díaz (4 goals) (shared)
 Top scorer 1987: Arnoldo Iguarán (4 goals)
 Top scorer 2001: Víctor Aristizábal (6 goals)
 Top scorer 2021: Luis Díaz (4 goals) (shared)
 Best young player 2015: Jeison Murillo

See also
 Colombia at the FIFA World Cup

References

External links
RSSSF archives and results
Soccerway database

Copa América record
Countries at the Copa América